Csaba Szekeres (born 30 January 1977) is a Hungarian former road cyclist. Professional from 2000 to 2007, he notably won the Hungarian National Road Race Championships in 1998 and the Hungarian National Time Trial Championships in 2005. He also competed in the UCI World Time Trial Championships for times as well as in the road race at the 2001 UCI Road World Championships.

Major results

1998
 National Road Championships
1st  Road race
2nd Time trial
2000
 1st Stage 5 Tour du Faso
2001
 2nd Road race, National Road Championships
2002
 2nd Time trial, National Road Championships
2003
 2nd Time trial, National Road Championships
2004
 2nd Time trial, National Road Championships
 7th Overall Tour de Hongrie
 10th GP Kooperativa
2005
 1st  Time trial, National Road Championships
 8th Puchar Uzdrowisk Karpackich
2006
 1st Stages 4 & 12b Tour de Pécs
 2nd Time trial, National Road Championships
 3rd Overall Tour de Hongrie
2007
 3rd Road race, National Road Championships
 6th GP Kooperativa

References

External links

1977 births
Living people
Hungarian male cyclists
Cyclists from Budapest